Canisius College  is a private Jesuit college in Buffalo, New York. It was founded in 1870 by Jesuits from Germany and is named after St. Peter Canisius. Canisius offers more than 100 undergraduate majors and minors, and around 34 master's and certificate programs.

History
Canisius has its roots in the Jesuit community that arose from disputed ownership of St. Louis Church in Buffalo in 1851. Rev. Lucas Caveng, a German Jesuit, along with 19 families from St. Louis Church, founded St. Michael's Church on Washington St. The college followed, primarily for serving sons of German immigrants, along with the high school in 1870, first at 434 Ellicott St. and next to St. Michael's. In 1913 construction of the Old Main building at 2001 Main St. was completed. The early presidents of the college were German Jesuits.

During the COVID-19 pandemic in July 2020, President John Hurley and the board of trustees made a decision to lay off a number of tenured faculty, including Classics, Chemistry, English, History, Management, Religious Studies, and Philosophy. Several majors were eliminated, including Classics, Entrepreneurship, European studies, Fine Arts, Human Services, International Business, Physics, Religious Studies, and Urban Studies. Some college faculty, students and members of the community have contested the decision, including two formal votes of no confidence by the college's faculty senate. The move also attracted criticism from numerous academic organizations, including the American Historical Association (AHA) and the Association for Slavic, East European and Eurasian Studies (ASEEES). After an almost yearlong investigation, the American Association of University Professors (AAUP) released a report on eight institutions (Canisius College, Illinois Wesleyan University, Keuka College, Marian University, Medaille College, National University, University of Akron, Wittenberg University)  that found that "some institutional leaders seem to have taken the COVID-19 crisis as an opportunity to turbocharge the corporate model that has been spreading in higher education over the past few decades, allowing them to close programs and lay off faculty members as expeditiously as if colleges and universities were businesses whose CEOs suddenly decided to stop making widgets or shut down the steelworks". The AAUP recommended that Canisius College be added to its list of sanctioned institutions due to "substantial noncompliance with standards of academic government". Several affected tenured faculty members also sued the college for violation of contract.

In 2015 Canisius College was one of more than 90 colleges investigated by the Department of Education's Office of Civil Rights for its handling of sexual assault and harassment complaints. In 2021, three former female student athletes filed a federal lawsuit in the Western District of New York alleging a hostile environment and that the college "failed to take appropriate action in response to these reports and complaints of sexual harassment, abuse and sexual assault".

In 2021, Hurley announced he was retiring as president of the college. After a months-long search, Steve Stoute was announced as the next president of Canisius.

In a separate federal lawsuit filed in 2022, five former students who are all women alleged that Canisius College ignored sexual misconduct complaints against Professor Michael Noonan and allowed him to retire in 2019 rather than pursuing Title XI complaints against him. On June 27, 2022, a judge allowed the former athletes’ case to proceed, describing the college’s delayed response to assault allegations as “inexplicable.”

Campus

Christ the King Chapel 
Christ the King Chapel, designed by Buffalo architect Duane Lyman, is centrally located to "symbolize its importance". It was completed in 1951 and has seating for 492.

Science Hall 
Science Hall was built as a Sears and Roebuck store in 1929. The college has allocated $68 million for its renovation, over $35 million of which has been raised with help from the John R. Oishei Foundation.

Science Hall Parking Ramp 

The parking ramp originally served the Sears and Roebuck building at 1901 Main St. However, throughout the history of ramp, Canisius students have used it for parking, with Sears advertising in The Griffin student newspaper that parking was free. Acquisition of the property has eliminated parking problems. The ramp was demolished in 2022. A new green space surface lot is planned to replace it.

Churchill Academic Tower 
The 11-story Churchill Academic Tower was built in 1971, designed by Leroy H. Welch. It is named for its chief benefactor, Rev. Clinton H. Churchill and his wife Francis. The Tower is routinely derided but serves as a highly functional space.

Andrew L. Bouwhuis Library
Built in 1957 and upgraded in 1988 and from 2013 through 2015, Andrew L. Bouwhuis Library, named for Andrew L. Bouwhuis, S.J., college librarian from 1935 to 1955, furnishes extensive area for study and research. It seats 500 people and includes group study rooms, an audio-visual listening/viewing area, a rare book room, an instruction room, a Curriculum Materials Center, and a lounge, along with private study rooms accommodating one to eight people.

The Koessler Athletic Center 

Located at 1833 Main Street in Buffalo, the Koessler Athletic Center (KAC) is named after J. Walter Koessler, class of 1922. The facility has a swimming pool, two weight rooms, two gymnasiums, and locker rooms and offices for athletic coaches and support staff.

Academics 
Canisius offers more than 100 majors, minors, and special programs.  The college is accredited by the Middle States Association Commission on Higher Education, the National Council for Accreditation of Teacher Education (NCATE), and the Association to Advance Collegiate Schools of Business (AACSB).  In fall 2009, Canisius College introduced a new major in Animal Behavior, Ecology, and Conservation.  Other new majors include Creative Writing, Health and Wellness, and Journalism. With the George E. Schreiner '43, MD, Pre-Medical Center as an asset, the college caters strongly to the biological and health science fields and holds close relationships with both the University at Buffalo School of Medicine and the Lake Erie College of Osteopathic Medicine (LECOM).

Rankings 
Canisius earned the 21st spot in the top tier of U.S. News & World Report's 2022 rankings of America's Best Regional Universities – North. U.S. News also ranked Canisius thirteenth in the 2016 "Great Schools, Great Prices" listing among regional universities in the North.  Canisius earned the eighth spot among 49 regional universities in the North in U.S. News' Best Colleges for Veterans Ranking, as well as #4 in Best Value Schools and #26 in Top Performers on Social Mobility, for 2022. Canisius College alumni ranked first (1st), overall, in New York State on the 2014 CPA exam cycle, with a 75 percent pass rate, in the category of medium programs.

Student life
Canisius has on campus about 90 clubs and organizations, vetted by the Undergraduate Student Association and its senators. Program offerings include the Best of Buffalo series, Fusion game nights, the Fall Semi-Formal, the Canisius Royals competition, the Mass of the Holy Spirit with Fall BBQ and Bonfire, Griffin Week, and Griff Fest (formerly "Quad Party" & "Springfest"). With a growing student population in its colleges, Buffalo has begun offering free Canal-side concerts, along with "Shakespeare in the Park", the Polish Broadway Market, Silo City "Boom Days" (on Buffalo's industrial history), and Dyngus Day.

Athletics

The college sponsors 20 NCAA Division 1 Athletic teams and is a member of the Metro Atlantic Athletic Conference (MAAC) as well as the Atlantic Hockey Conference. Men's sports include baseball, ice hockey, and golf.  Women's sports include volleyball and softball. The Golden Griffins compete in the NCAA Division I and are members of the Metro Atlantic Athletic Conference (MAAC) for most sports, except for men's ice hockey which competes in the Atlantic Hockey Association.  In 2013, the men's ice hockey team won its first Atlantic Hockey Championship, earning a bid to the NCAA Tournament.  In 2008, Canisius men's lacrosse won the MAAC tournament and earned its first bid to the NCAA Men's Lacrosse Championship tournament.

The Women's Lacrosse team won MAAC Championships four years in a row (2010-2014).  The 2008 Baseball team won its first regular season MAAC championship, with a 41–13 season, and the following year made its first appearance in the MAAC Championship game. In 2013, the team won the MAAC Championship and received its first bid to the NCAA tournament. The Canisius College softball team won the 2009 Metro Atlantic Athletic Conference tournament for its 3rd consecutive title, marking the team's 11th trip to the NCAA tournament in 15 years. In its rivalry with Niagara University Canisius won the Canal Cup two of the first three years (2008 and 2009).  Intramural sports are also offered for students, faculty, and staff.

Canisius' mascot is the Golden Griffin. The college adopted the Griffin as a mascot in 1932, after Charles A. Brady ('33) wrote a story in a Canisius publication honoring Buffalo's centennial year as a city. Brady wrote about Jesuit-educated explorer Rene-Robert LaSalle's Le Griffon, which was built in Buffalo. The Griffin was first used on the La Salle medal in 1932 and from there spread to the college newspaper, The Griffin, and sports teams. According to GoGriffs.com, the griffin is a "legendary creature with the body, tail, and back legs of a lion; the head and wings of an eagle; and an eagle's talons as its front feet." It represents values such as courage, boldness, intelligence, and strength befitting students and athletes alike.

The college was also the first home field of the Buffalo All-Americans of the early National Football League. Around 1917 Buffalo manager Barney Lepper signed a lease for the team to play their home games at Canisius College. The All-Americans played games at Canisius before relocating to Bison Stadium in 1924.

Greek life
Canisius College's fraternities and sororities are overseen by the Canisius College Office of Student Life. The three college-approved Greek organizations on campus are the Lambda chapter of the fraternity Sigma Phi Epsilon (SigEp), the sorority Phi Sigma Sigma, and the professional organization Alpha Kappa Psi (AK Psi). Also there is a Classics Club which fosters interest in the study of ancient Greek and Roman history, language, and culture; it hosts events like readings and discussions of ancient texts, Saturnalia, and alcohol-free toga parties. The club fosters the Jesuit value of a Classical education, as well as cura personalis.

Media
The student weekly newspaper is The Griffin, which replaced The Canisian in 1933 and continues to print weekly. The annual Quadrangle magazine contains student writings, artwork, and photographs. Public-access television cable TV broadcasts to Canisius College from its fourth floor studio at Lyons Hall. The WIRE, replacing WCCG, is the college's radio station, which broadcasts over the campus television system and is online through the college website.

ROTC 
Canisius College is the Reserve Officer Training Corps hub for Western New York. The Golden Griffin Battalion is composed of students from Canisius, University at Buffalo (UB), Hilbert College, D'Youville College, Daemen College, Medaille College, Buffalo State College, and Erie Community College.

Public safety 
Canisius College Public Safety Officers are sworn Peace Officers pursuant to New York State Criminal Procedure Law section 2.10-72 and perform many of the same duties as any traditional Police Department. Each Officer receives law enforcement training which meets or exceeds the New York State Division of Criminal Justice Services requirements for Peace Officers and they are authorized to carry firearms. Officers are authorized to enforce all Federal, State, and Local laws, as well as the rules and regulations of the college, and they do make arrests. Officers also perform a wide range of other duties which include: vehicular and foot patrol, criminal investigation, dispatch, welfare checks, first-aid and CPR, motorist assistance, and escorts.

Notable alumni

Canisius has approximately 40,000 living alumni worldwide who are working in the fields of business, journalism, government, law, medicine, and sports.

Academia
James Demske, S.J. (Class of 1947), President of Canisius College (1966–1993)
 Steven Seegel, Ph.D. (Class of 1999) - Professor of Slavic and Eurasian Studies at University of Texas at Austin

Business
 John Rowe (Class of 1966), former chairman and CEO of Aetna
 Dennis F. Strigl (Class of 1974), President and CEO of Verizon Wireless
 Mary Wittenberg, (Class of 1984), President and CEO of the New York Road Runners

Journalism and television
 Anne Burrell (Class of 1991), Food Network chef
 Norm Hitzges (Class of 1965), Texas Radio Hall of Fame, SportsRadio 1310 The Ticket - Dallas, TX
 Elizabeth MacDonald (Class of 1984), Gerald Loeb Award and multiple other awards winning financial journalist with The Wall Street Journal, anchorwoman on Fox Business, appeared on NBC's The Today Show, ABC's World News Tonight, Outnumbered, Your World with Neil Cavuto,  CBS This Morning, C-SPAN, Court TV, ABC News Radio,  NPR, and others
 Todd McDermott, (Class of 1983), Emmy Award-winning news anchor at WPIX-TV, Pittsburgh, Pennsylvania
 Michael Scheuer (Class of 1974), CBS News terrorism analyst, former CIA Chief of the Bin Laden Issue Station and author of Imperial Hubris
 Adam Zyglis, (Class of 2004), Pulitzer Prize-winning editorial cartoonist for The Buffalo News

Government and law
 John Thomas Curtin (Class of 1946), former US Attorney and Federal Judge for the Western District of New York
 Charles S. Desmond (Class of 1917), former Chief Judge of the New York Court of Appeals*
 John J. LaFalce (Class of 1961), former US Representative for New York
 Walter J. Mahoney (Class of 1930), former Majority Leader of the New York State Senate and New York Supreme Court Judge*
 Salvatore R. Martoche (Class of 1962), New York State Supreme Court Justice and former Assistant Secretary of the United States Treasury and Labor Departments
 Anthony M. Masiello (Class of 1969), former Mayor of Buffalo, New York
 Richard D. McCarthy (Class of 1950), former US Representative for New York*
 James T. Molloy  (Class of 1958), former Doorkeeper, US House of Representatives*
 Henry J. Nowak (Class of 1957), former US Representative for New York
 Denise O'Donnell (Class of 1968), former US Attorney for the Western District of New York
 William Paxon (Class of 1977), former US Representative for New York
 William M. Skretny (Class of 1966), Federal Judge for the Western District of New York
 Lawrence J. Vilardo (Class of 1977), Federal Judge for the Western District of New York
 Frank A. Sedita (Class of 1930), former Mayor of Buffalo, New York*

Medicine and science
 Donald Pinkel (Class of 1947), pediatric cancer researcher; former Director of the St. Jude Children's Research Hospital

Psychology
 Paula Caligiuri, Distinguished Professor of International Business and Strategy at D'Amore-McKim School of Business, Northeastern University

Sports
 Cory Conacher, NHL player for the Tampa Bay Lightning, Ottawa Senators, Buffalo Sabres and New York Islanders
 Bob MacKinnon (Class of 1950), former NBA Head Coach and General Manager of the New Jersey Nets
 Chris Manhertz (Class of 2015) NFL tight end for Jacksonville Jaguars
 Johnny McCarthy (Class of 1956), member of the 1963–64 NBA Champion Boston Celtics
 Gerry Meehan, former NHL player and General Manager of the Buffalo Sabres
 Dick Poillon, member of the 1942 NFL Champion Washington Redskins and Pro Bowl selection
 Michael Smrek (Class of 1985), member of the 1986–87 and 1987-88 NBA Champion Los Angeles Lakers
 Beth Phoenix, professional wrestler, Class of 2017 WWE Hall of Famer, former WWE Divas Champion & three-time WWE Women's Champion
 Matt Vinc, three-time NLL Champion 2012, 2013, 2014 for the Rochester Knighthawks
 Eyal Yaffe (Class of 1986), basketball player in the Israeli Basketball Premier League

Other
 Molly Burhans (Class of 2014), Environmentalist, Cartographer, Social Entrepreneur; United Nations Young Champion of the Earth, National Geographic Explorer, Head Cartographer of first global digital map of the Catholic Church.

See also
 List of Jesuit sites

References

External links

 
 Canisius Athletics website

 
1870 establishments in New York (state)
Buffalo (1920s NFL teams)
Defunct National Football League venues
Education in Buffalo, New York
Educational institutions established in 1870
Jesuit universities and colleges in the United States
Universities and colleges in Erie County, New York
Catholic universities and colleges in New York (state)
Association of Catholic Colleges and Universities
Liberal arts colleges in New York (state)